Banksy Does New York is a 2014 HBO documentary film directed by Chris Moukarbel about Banksy's Better Out Than In project. The documentary covers Banksy's one month residency in October 2013, in which the artist presented a new work of art daily and announced the locations via his Instagram account each morning.

Among the artworks filmed and described are a cement sphinx, a truck of moving puppet farm animals driven and parked in front of various New York butchers and meat markets, paintings which were sold for a day in Central Park for $60 each which were then estimated to be worth hundreds of thousands of dollars, and the Banality of the Banality of Evil, which portrays a man dressed as a Nazi peacefully sitting and looking out over an already existing landscape from—and then donated back to—a charitable thrift shop.

References

External links
 

2014 films
Banksy
HBO documentary films
Films set in New York City
2010s American films